Gilly-sur-Isère (literally Gilly on Isère) is a commune in the Savoie department in the Auvergne-Rhône-Alpes region in south-eastern France.

Gilly-sur-Isere is situated at the edge of Albertville to the bottom of the Combe de Savoie where you can access the valleys of Maurienne and Tarentaise and the valley of Arly and Beaufortain.

Geography

Climate

Gilly-sur-Isère has a oceanic climate (Köppen climate classification Cfb).

See also
Communes of the Savoie department

References

External links

Official site

Communes of Savoie